Substance D is a drum and bass compilation album mixed by Dieselboy. The first disc is mixed and the second disc is unmixed. The CD art was designed by Akira Takahashi (who also created the CD art for Dieselboy's "The 6ixth Session" and "The Dungeonmaster's Guide"). Substance D was released on May 6, 2008, and debuted at #21 on Billboard's Electronic Album Chart.

Track listing
Disc One (mixed by Dieselboy)
Warning Label - Dieselboy & Ewun
Trauma/Cell (SPKTRM Duomix) - Demo
One of Them (Current Value Remix) - Limewax
Pressure Drop VIP - Technical Itch
The Calling (Evol Intent & Ewun Remix) - Technical Itch & Kemal
Death Sentence - Psidream
We Want Your Soul (Raiden Remix) - Freeland
Midnight Express - Dieselboy, Evol Intent, & Ewun
Machine March - SPKTRM
Fear/Machine (Demo Duomix) - Current Value
O.D. - Demo
SFX - The Upbeats
Timewarp VIP - Counterstrike
Paris (The Upbeats Remix) - MSTRKRFT
Load Rocket (Gridlok Remix) - Computer Club
Helter Skelter (Mayhem & Evol Intent Remix) - Meat Beat Manifesto
N/V/D (Counterstrike Zentraedi Remix) - Dieselboy

Disc Two (unmixed tracks)
Midnight Express - Dieselboy, Evol Intent, & Ewun
Pressure Wounds - Tetradin & Advance
Step Up - Friske & Perpetuum
Rail Gun - Demo & Cease
N/V/D (Counterstrike Zentraedi Remix) - Dieselboy
O.D. - Demo
The Big Pullback - Noah D
Machine March - SPKTRM
Load Rocket (Gridlok Remix) - Computer Club
Parallel Universe - Infiltrata & Define
Fatal - The Fix

See also
Dieselboy
Human Imprint
The 6ixth Session
The Dungeonmaster's Guide
The Human Resource

References
Review by Mark Jenkins in The Washington Post, June 6, 2008.

External links

www.myspace.com/humanimprint
Official site

Dieselboy albums
2008 compilation albums